Onwenu is a surname. Notable people with the surname include:

D. K. Onwenu (died 1956), Nigerian teacher and politician
Michael Onwenu (born 1997), American football player
Onyeka Onwenu (born 1952), Nigerian singer/songwriter, actress, and activist